Chris Velan is a Montreal-based singer-songwriter and guitarist.

Career
While in college, he studied law. After passing the bar, he traveled to West Africa where he was the music producer of a documentary film about a group of refugee musicians from Sierra Leone.

In 2003 Velan returned from West Africa, releasing his debut solo album It's Not What You Think, which incorporated a mix of his old and new influences ranging from folk, pop and rock to world music and reggae.

Live, Velan uses a loop pedal which thickens and layers the music, as he performs live as a one-man band. His last album Solidago was released on NewSong Recordings. This is his third solo album and some of the artists featured on this album include San Francisco artists The Mother Hips, Animal Liberation Orchestra, Jackie Greene and Adam Topol (Culver City Dub Collective, Jack Johnson (musician).

Influences 
Velan's influences include Neil young, Cat Stevens, Robbie Robertson, Van Morrison and Mark Knopfler

Velan has been compared to artists including Tom Petty, Bob Dylan, and Jack Johnson. Due to his use of the loop pedal at his live performances, he has also been compared to KT Tunstall.

Experience 
Velan has performed with well-known acts across North America including:

Discography 
Solo
Songs About Songs – 19 May 2023
Amateur Hour – 14 September 2018
Glow – 2 March 2016
The Long Goodbye – 23 July 2013
Fables for Fighters – 7 June 2011
Solidago – Released 7 April 2009
Twitter, Buzz, Howl – 8 January 2007
It's Not What You Think – 25 November 2003

With Equalizer
Rise (1998) – Peter UnPlugged

As Producer
Sierra Leone's Refugee All Stars -"Living Like a Refugee" (2006) – Anti- Records

References

Canadian male singer-songwriters
Canadian singer-songwriters
Musicians from Montreal
Living people
Year of birth missing (living people)
Place of birth missing (living people)